Teknoaidi is a Finnish hardcore techno and speedcore musician. His music is influenced by folk, world music and noise. He describes his music with the term shamancore. Teknoaidi is a part of the Kovaydin.NET netlabel.

The artist's former alias is Zutsuu. Teknoaidi is also a member in the Hiiden Virren Vinguttajat duo.

Releases

Albums
 The Source Field Manifestations (Splatterkore Reck-ords, 2012)
 Starseed Integration and Repatriation (K-NeT Label, 2015)

EPs
 Hiiden Virren Vinguttajat (Chase Records, 2012)
 Positive Phuture Timeline (Kovaydin.NET, 2017)

Compilations
 Corekatsaus 2012 (Kovaydin.NET, 2012)
 Kovaydin.NET 10v – 10 Years of Suomicore (Kovaydin.NET, 2015)
 Speedcore Worldwide Sampler Vol.3 unstoppable underground infection (Speedcore Worldwide Audio Netlabel, 2015)
 Compulsive Speed Excess! (Speedcore Worldwide Audio Netlabel, 2016)
 Sounds From The Finnish Hardcore Techno Underground Vol. 2 (Kovaydin.NET, 2017)

References

Further reading 

 (SKFREE043) Teknoaidi – The Source Field Manifestations Splatterkore Reck-ords, 2012
 K-NeT-35 – Teknoaidi – Starseed Integration And Repatriation K-NeT Label, 2015
 Kovaydin.NET: Releases Kovaydin.NET
 Speedcore Worldwide Sampler Vol.3 unstoppable underground infection Speedcore Worldwide Audio Netlabel, 2015

External links 
 
 
 

Hardcore techno musicians
Finnish electronic musicians
1985 births
Living people